Arwen is a character from The Lord of the Rings.

Arwen may also refer to:
Arwen Colles, an area of hills on Titan, the largest moon of the planet Saturn
"Arwen", a track on the 2013 album Crown Electric by Kathryn Williams
Storm Arwen, a 2021–22 European windstorm

See also
 ARWEN 37 and ARWEN ACE, two models of the ARWEN less lethal launcher manufactured by Police Ordnance Company Inc. in Ontario, Canada.
 Arwyn, the equivalent masculine, Welsh given name, and people so named